The women's rhythmic individual ball gymnastics competition at the 2014 Commonwealth Games in Glasgow, Scotland was held on 26 July at the Scottish Exhibition and Conference Centre.

Final
Results:

References

Gymnastics at the 2014 Commonwealth Games
2014 in women's gymnastics